José Luis Martínez Vázquez (2 July 1943 – 19 April 2004) was a Spanish athlete. He competed in the men's hammer throw at the 1968 Summer Olympics.

References

External links
 

1943 births
2004 deaths
Athletes (track and field) at the 1968 Summer Olympics
Spanish male hammer throwers
Olympic athletes of Spain
Sportspeople from León, Spain
20th-century Spanish people
21st-century Spanish people